Joseph Patrick Tumulty (pronounced TUM-ulty; May 5, 1879 – April 9, 1954) was an American attorney and politician from New Jersey.  He was a leader of the Irish Catholic political community. He is best known for his service from 1911 until 1921 as the private secretary of U.S. President Woodrow Wilson.

Background

Tumulty was born on May 5, 1879 in Jersey City, New Jersey to middle-class Catholic parents Philip and Alicia (Feehan) Tumulty.  He attended St. Bridget's School, and graduated from Saint Peter's College, New Jersey in 1901. Tumulty was active in Democratic state politics in New Jersey, serving in the New Jersey General Assembly in 1907-1910.

Career

As a state legislator, Tumulty acted as an adviser to Woodrow Wilson in his 1910 gubernatorial campaign.  He then served as Wilson's private secretary in 1911, when Wilson was Governor of New Jersey, and in 1913-1921 when Wilson was President of the United States.  This position would in later years become the White House Chief of Staff.

During his time as Wilson's secretary, Tumulty filled many different roles including press secretary, public relations manager, campaign organizer for the Catholic and Irish vote, and adviser for minor patronage appointments.  His relationship with Wilson was nearly terminated over his opposition to Wilson's marriage in December 1915 to Edith Wilson only a few months after the death of his first wife.  Although Wilson declined Tumulty's offer to resign, their relationship was never again as close.

Following Wilson's reelection in 1916, the president yielded to anti-Catholic sentiment from Edith Wilson and Wilson's adviser Col. Edward M. House and dismissed Tumulty.  Though he was ultimately reinstated after intervention by his former student David Lawrence, Tumulty's relationship with Edith Wilson remained frosty.

Wilson left office in March 1921. Though his influence in Washington was greatly diminished thereafter, Tumulty remained in the city as a practicing attorney until his death 33 years later.

Hiss Case involvement

In August–September 1948, Tumulty was one of many prominent lawyers who advised Alger Hiss on whether to file a defamation suit against Whittaker Chambers after Chambers stated on NBC Radio's Meet the Press that Hiss had been a Communist. On August 31, 1948, Hiss wrote to his lifelong friend and fellow Harvard lawyer William L. Marbury, Jr.:I am planning a suit for libel or defamation...  The number of volunteer helpers is considerable: Freddy Pride of Dwight, Harris, Koegel & Casking (the offshoot of young Charles Hughes' firm), Fred Eaton of Shearman and Sterling, Eddie Miller of Mr. Dulles' firm, Marshall McDuffie, now no longer a lawyer; in Washington Joe Tumulty, Charlie Fahy, Alex Hawes, John Ferguson (Mr. Ballantine's son-in-law) and others–but the real job is get general overall counsel and that fortunately is now settled, but we must move swiftly as so far the committee with its large investigating staff and considerable resources has been able to seize the initiative continuously and regularly. Everyone has been most helpful...

Views

A "conservative progressive" in his own words, Tumulty was a proponent of women's suffrage and war-time censorship, and was a supporter of A. Mitchell Palmer's deportation of Red (Communist) aliens in 1919.  Wilson's absence from active-day-to-day executive leadership in 1919-1920 during the negotiations at Versailles, and his later severe stroke and illness meant that a significant share of the work of the White House was done by Tumulty and Edith Wilson, who continued to lobby against him.  Tumulty's support of Palmer, and of "wet" presidential candidate James M. Cox, ultimately led to his final break with Wilson.

In his approach to politics, Tumulty was a believer in the power of the state to tackle inequities in American society. This was demonstrated in June 1919 when (at a time of great industrial unrest in the United States) Tumulty had recommended to Wilson that he call on Congress to advocate reforms that met the needs of working people. These included such reforms as a federal employment agency, federal housing, old-age pensions, a federal minimum wage, equal pay, a profit-sharing plan, and health insurance. Wilson failed, however, to encourage Congress to enact the kinds of measures advocated by Tumulty, although nearly all of his proposals would eventually be realized under the New Deal program of future Democratic president Franklin Delano Roosevelt.

Personal and death

Tumulty died on April 9, 1954, in Olney, Maryland. He is buried in St. Mary's Catholic Cemetery in Rockville, Maryland.

Works
Tumulty published a memoir, Woodrow Wilson As I Know Him (1921).  The book enraged Wilson, who made it known that his former private secretary would never again be admitted into his presence or inner circle.

References

Further reading
 Blum,  John Morton. Joe Tumulty and the Wilson Era (1951).
 Startt, James D. Woodrow Wilson, the Great War, and the Fourth Estate (Texas A&M UP, 2017) 420 pp.

External links

 
 
 "Joseph Patrick Tumulty Papers"
 Political Graveyard info for Joseph Patrick Tumulty
 Blum, John Morton, Joe Tumulty and the Wilson Era, Houghton Mifflin, 1951 Read at Google Books
 

Democratic Party members of the New Jersey General Assembly
1870 births
1954 deaths
American biographers
Lawyers from Washington, D.C.
New Jersey lawyers
Saint Peter's University alumni
Personal secretaries to the President of the United States
Politicians from Jersey City, New Jersey
Writers from Jersey City, New Jersey
Catholics from New Jersey